The Gemunu Watch (GW) ("King Dutugemunu's Own")  is a infantry regiment of the Sri Lanka Army, formed with troops from the Ceylon Light Infantry and the Ceylon Sinha Regiment in 1962. It has been deployed in many major operations against the LTTE. It is made up of 14 regular units and 9 volunteer units. Headquartered at Kuruwita Army Camp, Ratnapura. It is named after one of the most famous Lankan Kings, King Dutugemunu.

History
The roots of the Gemunu Watch can be traced to the volunteer formations of the British Empire and the formation of the Ceylon Infantry Regiment by a Gazette notification on 1 April 1881. Later, in order to encourage the concept of Volunteering, the Volunteer Force was expanded to include Units at District level.  Accordingly, two Volunteer Detachments were set up in Galle and Matara in the old Dutch Forts. Thereafter, the Ceylon Defence Force was established under Army Order No: 08 of 1910, to cater to the administration and discipline of these regiments, and came under the direct purview of the Commandant, Ceylon Defence Force. During the first World War (1914 to 1918), the Ceylon Defence Force was engaged in active service and the troops deployed in Galle and Matara too were mobilized. After the War, the CDF was systematically “Ceylonised” by the appointment of Ceylonese Officers as commanding officers of Battalions.

Following Ceylon gaining self rule in 1948, and the establishment of the Ceylon Army under the Army Act, the Ceylon Defence Force became the Ceylon Volunteer Force and the detachments in Galle and Matara were renamed as “B” Company of the 2nd Battalion (Volunteer), Ceylon Light Infantry. The “B” Company in Galle and Matara was renamed as the Ruhuna Volunteer Regiment in 1950 with Colonel C. A. Dharmapala, its first commanding officer. In 1956, with the change in the national political leadership to the Sri Lanka Freedom Party, the Ruhuna Regiment did not find favour with the political hierarchy and was disbanded. Subsequently, in October 1956, the second Regular Infantry Battalion, the 1st Battalion of the Sinha Regiment was established in the Imperial Camp in Diyatalawa. Thereafter, the 2nd [Volunteer] Battalion of the Sinha Regiment was raised in Kandy. When the Ruhuna Regiment was disbanded, the troops located in Galle and Matara were attached to various units. Subsequently, the troops that were deployed in Galle formed the “C” Company of the 2nd [Vol] Battalion of the Sinha Regiment. In the latter half of 1959, 110 soldiers deployed as “C” Company of the 2nd [Vol] Battalion, Sinha Regiment under the command of Capt. D.S. Amarasuriya were brought together to form a new Volunteer Unit called the Gemunu Regiment, which was raised in Galle on 23 November 1959. Capt. D.S. Amarasuriya was appointed the commanding officer. The new Unit did not have a flag or cap badge, therefore, it was originally proposed to have the image of a Leopard associated with the Yala Sanctuary with cross rifles designed for the cap badge.  However, it was not adopted.  As the Permanent Staff of the Unit was drawn from the Sinha Regiment, they followed the traditions associated with the Sinha Regiment.

The third Regular Infantry Regiment, the 1st Battalion of the Gemunu Watch, was raised at the Ceylon Volunteer Force [CVF] Camp in Diyatalawa on 7 December 1962 and subsequently occupied the Rangala Camp of the Royal Ceylon Navy and the Imperial Camp vacated by the Sinha Regiment (which had been moved to Colombo). As Gemunu originated in Ruhuna, the Volunteer Gemunu Regiment established in Galle and the detachment located in Matara were renamed Gemunu Battalions, and formed the Volunteer counterparts of the 1st Battalion of the Gemunu Watch.

The Founding Father and first commanding officer of the 1st Battalion of the Gemunu Watch, Lieut. Colonel John Halangode was from the 1st Battalion of the Ceylon Light Infantry. He was inspired by the traditions of the British Regiment, the Black Watch, and inculcated those norms and customs into the 1st Battalion of the Gemunu Watch. The nucleus of 1GW consisted of Officers and Other Rank Cadres drawn from the Regular Units already established.

Units

Major Operations

 Task Force Anti-Illicit Immigration (TAFII)
 Anti-Smuggling
 1st JVP Insurrection
 Operation Liberation (Vadamarachchi Operation)
 Sath Bala
 Balavegaya
 Thrivida Balaya
 Akunupahara
 Sun Island
 Green Belt I and II
 Rivirasa
 Edibalaya I and II
 Dasa Bala
 Jayasikuru
 Randunna I and II
 Ranajaya
 Ranabala
 Operation Jayashakthi
 Ranagosa I, II, III, IV and V
 Kinihira VII
 Holding and securing the Kiran Camp in Batticaloa
 Eastern Theater of Eelam War IV
 Sri Lankan Army Northern offensive

Colonels of the Regiment

Alliances
 - Black Watch

Notable members
General T. I. Weerathunga, VSV - 9th Commander of the Army & High Commissioner to Canada
General G. H. De Silva, RWP, VSV, USP - 13th Commander of the Army &  High Commissioner to Pakistan
Lieutenant General Parami Kulatunga, RSP, USP  - Former Deputy Chief of Staff of the Army
Major General Vijaya Wimalaratne, RWP, RSP, VSP, USP- Was transferred to the Gajaba Regiment as its 1st commanding officer when it was formed.
Major General Lakshman Algama, VSP, USP - Chief of Staff of the Army
 The Honourable Colonel C. A. Dharmapala, OBE, ED - first commanding officer of 3 (Volunteer) Battalion, former Permanent secretary to the Ministry of Defence and Security Advisor to the President J. R. Jayewardene, former Deputy Minister of Industries & Housing and was an ex Member of Parliament for Hakmana.
Major General Lalin T Fernando - former Commander Security Forces Headquarters - Jaffna (SF HQ (J))
Brigadier J. G. Balthazar - former Chief of Staff of the Army and former Commander, Security Forces Jaffna 
Brigadier Ariyasinghe Ariyapperuma  – Former Commander, Northern Command
Brigadier John Halangode - first commanding officer and Commander Colombo Force
Brigadier Hiran Halangode, RWP, RSP, USP, GW - Brigade Commander, 12th Brigade and Air Mobile Brigade
Brigadier Rohitha Neil Akmeemana, RSP, USP - First commanding officer of the 9th battalion.
Colonel Wickremasinghe Wimaladasa - Olympian and Asian Games gold medalist
 Colonel Rohitha wickramathilake RSP, USP, GW - Commanding officer 4th Battalion.KIA in Kokilay, Welioya
Lieutenant Colonel Srimal Mendis, RWP, GW - Officer Commanding, 1GW, KIA in Velvettiturai.

Order of precedence

External links and sources
 Sri Lanka Army
 Gemunu Watch
 THE GEMUNU WATCH EX-SERVICEMEN'S REGIMENTAL ASSOCIATION 
 45th Anniversary of Gemunu Watch

Specific

Infantry regiments of the Sri Lankan Army
Military units and formations established in 1962